"Over You" is a song written by Byron Hill and Tony Hiller and performed by Anne Murray.  The song reached number 11 on the Canadian Adult Contemporary chart and number 29 on the Canadian Country chart in 1995. The song appeared on her 1994 album, The Best…So Far. The song is about a woman who isn't over her former lover yet, and still holding on to the slight chance of him changing his mind and returning to her.

Chart performance

Year-end charts

References

1994 singles
Songs written by Byron Hill
Songs written by Tony Hiller
Anne Murray songs
Capitol Records singles
Song recordings produced by David Foster
1994 songs